Paul Chassagne (born 18 June 1932) is a French biathlete. He competed in the 20 km individual event at the 1972 Winter Olympics.

References

1932 births
Living people
French male biathletes
Olympic biathletes of France
Biathletes at the 1972 Winter Olympics
Place of birth missing (living people)